Khan Wahan, is a village in Kandiaro Taluka of Naushahro Feroze District, Sindh, Pakistan. It is the administrative headquarters of the Khan Wahan Union Council , Beautiful Village of Sindh.  another village Sirae Mehro khan Dahar near khanwahan at the head of 3 km.

The list of villages in Khan Wahan Union Council 
 Tunia Baqa Shah
 Saeed Khan Khusk
 Rais Shahnawaz Khan Khushk
 Juma Khan Dobal
 Tando Gulshah
 Madd Koondhar
 Aayal Tunia
 Ghulam Hyder Siyal
 Rais Haji Imdad Ali Khushk

Kandiaro Taluka
Naushahro Feroze District
Union councils of Sindh